Wang Wei (April 1974 – 22 September 2022) was a Chinese politician. A member of the Communist Party, he served in the National People's Congress from 2018 to 2022.

Wang died in Beijing on 22 September 2022, at the age of 48.

References

1974 births
2022 deaths
Chinese politicians
Delegates to the 13th National People's Congress
Delegates to the National People's Congress from Jiangsu